Richard Phillip Edmonds Jr. (born September 12, 1956), is an American pastor and politician from the U.S. state of Louisiana. A Republican, he is a member of the Louisiana House of Representatives from East Baton Rouge Parish and was among nine candidates for secretary of state in the 2018 special election to fill the seat vacated by Tom Schedler.

Edmonds finished in fourth place in the race with 164,949 (11 percent). His House colleague, Julie Stokes of Jefferson Parish, finished in fifth place, also with 11 percent of the ballots cast. In a runoff election in December, victory went to the Republican interim secretary Kyle Ardoin.

In the 2015 House election, Edmonds unseated a fellow Republican, the moderate Darrell Ourso.

Edmonds is a former pastor of the Calvary Baptist Church in Shreveport and a former figure in the Louisiana Family Forum. He lives in Baton Rouge and is currently Senior Pastor at First Baptist Church of McComb.

References

External links

1956 births
Living people
Republican Party members of the Louisiana House of Representatives
American clergy
People from Baton Rouge, Louisiana
People from Shreveport, Louisiana
Baptists from Louisiana
21st-century American politicians